Melissa Ann McCarthy (born August 26, 1970) is an American actress, comedian, producer, writer, and fashion designer. She is the recipient of numerous accolades, including two Primetime Emmy Awards, and nominations for two Academy Awards and two Golden Globe Awards. McCarthy was named by Time as one of the 100 most influential people in the world in 2016, and she has been featured multiple times in annual rankings of the highest-paid actresses in the world. In 2020, The New York Times ranked her #22 in its list of the 25 Greatest Actors of the 21st Century.

McCarthy began appearing in television and film in the late 1990s and first gained recognition for her role as Sookie St. James on the television series Gilmore Girls (2000–2007). She played Dena on the ABC sitcom Samantha Who? (2007–2009) before starring as Molly Flynn on the CBS sitcom Mike & Molly (2010–2016), for which she received the Primetime Emmy Award for Outstanding Lead Actress in a Comedy Series in 2011. McCarthy's appearances as a host on Saturday Night Live led to a win for the Primetime Emmy Award for Outstanding Guest Actress in a Comedy Series in 2017.

McCarthy gained critical acclaim for her performance in the comedy film Bridesmaids (2011), receiving a nomination for the Academy Award for Best Supporting Actress. She went on to star in several commercially successful comedies, including Identity Thief (2013), The Heat (2013), Tammy (2014), St. Vincent (2014), Spy (2015), and The Boss (2016). In 2018, McCarthy received critical acclaim for her portrayal of writer Lee Israel in the biographical film Can You Ever Forgive Me? (2018), earning a nomination for the Academy Award for Best Actress.

McCarthy and her husband Ben Falcone are the founders of the production company On the Day Productions, under which they have collaborated on several comedy films. In 2015, she launched her own clothing line for plus-sized women, named Melissa McCarthy Seven7, and she received a motion picture star on the Hollywood Walk of Fame.

Early life
Melissa Ann McCarthy was born on August 26, 1970, in Plainfield, Illinois to Sandra and Michael McCarthy. She is a cousin of actress and model Jenny McCarthy. McCarthy was raised on a farm in a large Catholic family. Her father is of Irish-Scottish descent, while her mother is of English, German, and Irish ancestry. Some of her forebears were from County Cork. She graduated from St. Francis Academy (now Joliet Catholic Academy) in Joliet, Illinois. Her career started with stand-up comedy in Los Angeles, and later in New York City. McCarthy is an alumna of The Groundlings, an improvisational and sketch comedy troupe based in Los Angeles, California. She also performed in New York City as a drag queen under the moniker Miss Y, including at the Wigstock festival.

Career

1997–2010: Early work, Gilmore Girls and Samantha Who?
McCarthy made her first television appearance in an episode of the NBC comedy series Jenny, opposite her cousin Jenny McCarthy. She made her feature film debut in a minor role in the 1999 comedy Go, and later had roles in the movies Drowning Mona, Disney's The Kid, Charlie's Angels, Charlie's Angels: Full Throttle, The Third Wheel and The Life of David Gale. She also worked in three episodes of Kim Possible, voicing DNAmy. In 2000, McCarthy was cast as Sookie St. James, the upbeat and klutzy best friend of Lorelai Gilmore, on The WB television series Gilmore Girls. Throughout the series, Sookie is Lorelai's business partner and cheerleader. On April 7, 2016, McCarthy announced on The Ellen DeGeneres Show that she would be returning for the show's revival, Gilmore Girls: A Year in the Life, on Netflix. The latter was released November 25, 2016 and McCarthy appeared in one of its four episodes.

In 2007, she starred opposite Ryan Reynolds in the science fantasy psychological thriller The Nines, written and directed by John August. She later starred in the independent comedies The Captain, Just Add Water, and Pretty Ugly People. Also in 2007, McCarthy starred as Dena Stevens on the ABC sitcom Samantha Who?. McCarthy played Samantha's socially awkward childhood best friend, whom Samantha hasn't seen since seventh grade. When Samantha wakes from her coma, Dena convinces Samantha that they have always been best friends. While Andrea eventually forces her to reveal the truth, Samantha still remains friends with Dena. She guest starred in Rita Rocks and on Private Practice. In 2010, McCarthy played supporting roles in films The Back-Up Plan and Life as We Know It.

2011–2015: Mike and Molly, Bridesmaids and success

On September 20, 2010, McCarthy was cast in a leading role on the CBS sitcom Mike & Molly. In 2011, McCarthy had a breakout performance in the comedy movie Bridesmaids alongside Kristen Wiig, Maya Rudolph, Rose Byrne, Wendi McLendon-Covey and Ellie Kemper. McCarthy received an Academy Award nomination for her performance. In fall 2011, after achieving fame from Bridesmaids, she received her first Emmy Award for Outstanding Lead Actress in a Comedy Series for her role on Mike & Molly. In June 2011, she hosted the Women in Film Crystal + Lucy Awards. McCarthy later had supporting roles in This Is 40 (2012), the spinoff to Judd Apatow's film Knocked Up, and The Hangover Part III (2013). She was invited to join the Academy of Motion Picture Arts and Sciences in June 2012 along with 175 others. McCarthy hosted Saturday Night Live on October 1, 2011, April 6, 2013, February 1, 2014, February 13, 2016, and May 12, 2017. She was nominated five times for a Primetime Emmy Award for Outstanding Guest Actress in a Comedy Series for her appearances on the television show from 2011 to 2017, winning in 2017.

In 2013, McCarthy co-starred in the crime comedy Identity Thief with Jason Bateman. Identity Thief opened at No. 1 at the box office, and grossed $174 million worldwide despite negative reviews.

In 2013, McCarthy co-starred with Sandra Bullock in the buddy cop comedy The Heat. The film was released in the United States and Canada on June 28, 2013, to both critical and commercial success. With McCarthy being called "box office gold," The Heat grossed $229 million worldwide.

McCarthy co-wrote the script for the movie Tammy, which was released on July 2, 2014. McCarthy's character loses her job and her car, and then learns that her husband has been unfaithful. To get away, she is forced to rely on her alcoholic grandmother (Susan Sarandon) for transportation as they embark on a journey of self-discovery.

McCarthy produced a CBS pilot which starred her husband, Ben Falcone. McCarthy played the female lead, opposite Bill Murray, in the 2014 comedy film St. Vincent, directed and written by Theodore Melfi. On November 19, 2014, it was announced that McCarthy would portray fairy heroine Tinker Bell in the untitled comedy-adventure directed by Shawn Levy. She would also produce the film. In addition, McCarthy was the lead in frequent collaborator Paul Feig's spy comedy Spy (2015), a role that earned McCarthy her first Golden Globe Award nomination.

In May 2015, McCarthy received a star on the Hollywood Walk of Fame. In August 2015, Forbes ranked her as the third highest-paid actress of 2015, with earnings of $23 million.

2016–present: Dramatic roles and awards recognition
In 2016, McCarthy starred in The Boss, a comedy film based on a character which McCarthy had created in the Los Angeles Groundlings – a wealthy businesswoman "who goes to jail for insider trading, and struggles to reinvent herself as America's new sweetheart when she's released". Also that year, she played an author and scientist in the all-female reboot of Ghostbusters, directed by Paul Feig.

On May 31, 2016, McCarthy was cast as celebrity biographer Lee Israel in the dark comedy-drama film Can You Ever Forgive Me? directed by Marielle Heller. She replaced Julianne Moore, who was fired shortly before shooting was to begin. McCarthy's performance as Lee drew high praise and Film Journal International said that her previous film roles "could not anticipate how fearlessly and credibly she inhabits Lee Israel." She received an Academy Award for Best Actress nomination. In 2016 she recorded the song "Anything You Can Do (I Can Do Better)" with Barbra Streisand which appears on Streisand's album Encore. On February 4 and 11, 2017 she made surprise appearances on Saturday Night Live portraying White House Press Secretary Sean Spicer. She returned to the show to portray Spicer on April 16 and May 13, 2017 (also hosting the latter).

McCarthy appeared in a Super Bowl LI ad for Kia Motors, promoting the Kia Niro. McCarthy played a wannabe environmentalist, who has a series of mishaps befall her such as being capsized by a whale, being charged by a rhino, and falling down a crevasse. The commercial featured the song "Holding Out for a Hero".

On June 28, 2019, it was announced that McCarthy was in talks to play Ursula in Disney's  upcoming film The Little Mermaid, set to be directed by Rob Marshall. On February 18, 2020, McCarthy confirmed her casting as the villainess during an interview on The Ellen DeGeneres Show.

Personal life
McCarthy married her longtime boyfriend Ben Falcone, an actor and alumnus of The Groundlings, on October 8, 2005. The couple have two daughters, Vivian and Georgette. McCarthy's pregnancy with Vivian was written into the last season of Gilmore Girls. Vivian and Georgette both made an appearance in the 2016 film The Boss, with the former playing a younger version of her mother's character.

Falcone often makes cameo appearances in McCarthy's movies and TV series, such as a third-season episode of Gilmore Girls, The Nines, Bridesmaids, The Heat, Tammy, Identity Thief, Spy, The Boss, Life of the Party, The Happytime Murders, Can You Ever Forgive Me? and Nine Perfect Strangers.

In the April 2021 issue of Instyle, McCarthy said that "[she is] on the left for sure" with regard to politics.

In August 2021, McCarthy joined the 40x40 campaign launched by Meghan Markle to mark her 40th birthday. 40x40 is a campaign that asks people around the world to spend 40 minutes of their time mentoring women reentering the workforce and combating the outsized economic impact of the COVID-19 pandemic on women.

Production
In 2013, McCarthy founded the production company On the Day Productions with her husband Ben Falcone. Tammy was the company's first project. The film cost $20 million.

Production credits

Film
 Tammy (2014; co-production with New Line Cinema and Gary Sanchez Productions)
 The Boss (2016; co-production with Universal Pictures and Gary Sanchez Productions)
 Life of the Party (2018; co-production with New Line Cinema)
 The Happytime Murders (2018; co-production with STX Entertainment, H. Brothers, Black Bear Pictures and Henson Alternative)
 Superintelligence (2020; distributed by HBO Max; co-production with New Line Cinema and Bron Creative)
 Thunder Force (2021; co-production with Netflix)
 Bob Ross: Happy Accidents, Betrayal & Greed (2021)
 Margie Claus (TBA; co-production with New Line Cinema)
 Untitled Tinker Bell Project (TBA; co-production with 20th Century Studios and 21 Laps Entertainment)
 Untitled Female Boston Cops Project (TBA; co-production with New Line Cinema)
 Cousin Irv From Mars (TBA; co-production with Universal Pictures)
 Just Do It (TBA; co-production with 20th Century Studios)
 Untitled Stanley Cup Project (TBA; co-production with Paramount Pictures)

Television

 Nobodies (2017–2018; co-production with Jax Media)
God’s Favorite Idiot (2022)

Fashion line
McCarthy studied textiles at Southern Illinois University, and was interested in a fashion career before she pursued her interests in acting. When she moved to New York City, it was to attend the Fashion Institute of Technology. One of her closest friends is shoe designer Brian Atwood. McCarthy also spent time working as the costumer for a dance company.

In 2015, McCarthy announced her first clothing collection, Melissa McCarthy Seven7, for plus-size women. The line includes clothes up to size 28. In an interview with More, McCarthy stated that "people don't stop at size 12. I feel like there's a big thing missing where you can't dress to your mood above a certain number. Malls segregate "plus-size" clothes stores and hide these stores away from other sections of the mall." Seven7, which was developed alongside Sunrise Brands, debuted in August 2015 on the Home Shopping Network.

Filmography

Film

Television

Awards and nominations

References

External links

 
 
 

1970 births
Living people
20th-century American actresses
21st-century American actresses
20th-century American comedians
21st-century American comedians
Actresses from Illinois
American film actresses
American film producers
American people of English descent
American people of German descent
American people of Irish descent
American television actresses
American voice actresses
American women comedians
American women screenwriters
McCarthy family
Outstanding Performance by a Lead Actress in a Comedy Series Primetime Emmy Award winners
People from Plainfield, Illinois
Southern Illinois University alumni
American women film producers
Writers from Illinois
Screenwriters from Illinois
Fashion Institute of Technology alumni